Elizabeth Mavor (17 December 1927 – 22 May 2013) was a British novelist and biographer.

Biography
Born in Glasgow, Scotland in 1927, she was educated at St Leonard's Schoolin St Andrews and St Anne's College, Oxford. She married the illustrator Haro Hodson, and had two sons and lived in Oxfordshire. She is best known as a novelist, and wrote A Green Equinox (1973), which was shortlisted for the Booker Prize in the same year. Her work as an historian and biographer includes The Ladies of Llangollen and Fanny Kemble: The American Journals.

Bibliography
  The Virgin Mistress: A Life of the Duchess of Kingston (1964) 
 The Ladies of Llangollen: A Study in Romantic Friendship (1971)  
 The Grand Tour of William Beckford (1986)  
 The Grand Tours of Katherine Wilmot: France 1801–3 and Russia 1805–7 (1992) (Compiler and Editor).
 A Year with the Ladies of Llangollen  
 Fanny Kemble: The American Journals (1990)
 The Captain's Wife: The South American Journals of Maria Graham 1821–23 (1993)
 Summer in the Greenhouse (1959), novel   
 The Temple of Flora (1961), novel   
 The Redoubt (1967), novel  
 The Green Equinox (1973), novel  
  The White Solitaire (1988), novel

References

1927 births
2013 deaths
Alumni of St Anne's College, Oxford
British biographers
People educated at St Leonards School
20th-century British novelists
20th-century biographers